Griffith Rutherford Harsh IV (born July 25, 1953) is an American neurosurgeon. In 2018, he became the chair of the department of neurological surgery at UC Davis Health. He is married to business executive Meg Whitman. He is a direct descendant of Revolutionary War General and North Carolina State Senator Griffith Rutherford (1721–1805).

Early life and education 
Griffith Rutherford Harsh IV was born in St. Louis in 1953. The son of his namesake, Griffith Harsh III, the younger Griffith became determined to follow in his father’s footsteps and become a neurosurgeon.

Harsh graduated summa cum laude and Phi Beta Kappa from Harvard University and became a Rhodes Scholar at New College, Oxford. At Oxford, he obtained a master's degree in neurological sciences. After his two years at Oxford, he enrolled at Harvard Medical School, graduating in 1980. He moved on to complete his residency and fellowship training in the Department of Neurosurgery and the Brain Tumor Research Center at the University of California, San Francisco.

Career 
Griffith Harsh IV graduated from Harvard College in 1975 and Harvard Medical School in 1980. He completed his residency at the department of neurosurgery and the brain tumor research center at the University of California, San Francisco (UCSF) in 1986. The following year he completed his fellowship in neurosurgery at UCSF. In addition, Griff Harsh completed a fellowship in clinical neuro-oncology at UCSF and another fellowship in skull base surgery and acoustic neuromas at the University of Pittsburgh. During his career, Harsh has focused on the surgical and radiation treatment of pituitary adenomas, glial tumors, and acoustic neuromas.

He served as the vice chair of the department of neurosurgery, the director of the Stanford brain tumor center, and as associate dean of CME education at the Stanford University School of Medicine. He also served as a Professor of Neurosurgery at the Stanford University Medical Center and Program Director of Neurosurgery Residency at Stanford. He is certified in neurological surgery by the American Board of Neurological Surgery.

, he is the Julian R. Youmans Chair in Neurological Surgery at UC Davis Medical Center.

Harsh is a member of the board of fellows of Harvard Medical School.

Neurosurgical advancements 
Harsh has been credited with the creation of a device that assists in aggressive intratumoral radiation. In 2001, Stanford released news of this device and preliminary studies indicated that the risks associated with radiation therapy for brain tumors are noticeably lower when using this device. Approved by the FDA, the device was tested in a study sponsored by the National Cancer Institute and the Stanford Brain Tumor Center currently uses it in patients with newly diagnosed or recurring primary or metastatic brain tumors.

Harsh has published over 100 clinical and scientific articles, including several identifying key pathways in brain tumorigenesis, appearing in PNAS, Science, and the New England Journal of Medicine.

Personal life 
Harsh is married to Meg Whitman, the former CEO of eBay and former CEO of Hewlett Packard Enterprise; she was also the 2010 Republican nominee for governor of California.

References 

1953 births
20th-century American physicians
21st-century American physicians
Alumni of New College, Oxford
American Rhodes Scholars
American neurosurgeons
Harvard Medical School alumni
Living people
People from Atherton, California
Physicians from California
Physicians from Missouri
Stanford University School of Medicine faculty
University of California, San Francisco alumni
20th-century surgeons